The Hami melon is a type of muskmelon, originally from Hami, Xinjiang, China.
It is also referred to as the Chinese Hami melon or the snow melon.  The outer color is generally white through pink or yellow through green.  The inside flesh is sweet and crisp.

In Mandarin, Hami gua can also be used to refer to cantaloupe.

Cultivation 
The origin of the Hami melon can be traced back to the Han dynasty in China. From 58 to 76 AD, Hami melons were given to Emperor Ming of Han by officials as a rare tribute from the Western Regions and called .

Xinjiang's unique geographical environment (high altitude, large temperature difference between day and night, and sufficient sunshine) has created different varieties of Hami melon, such as the Yellow Honey Hami Melon and the Red Honey Hami Melon. More than 100 cultivated forms and hybrids of the 'Hami' melon have been grown in China.

The Xinjiang Uygur Autonomous Region has different protected areas for the cultivation of Hami melon, among which Yiwu County, Hami, has an area the length of 150 kilometers. The storage method of Hami melon at low temperatures is also unique. Among them, Gold Queen Hami Melons can be stored at 3°C for 18 days and still maintain the original taste.

References

 
 
 China Culture
 

Melons